Justin Williams (born 1981) is an ice hockey player.

Justin Williams may also refer to:

Justin Williams (baseball) (born 1995), American baseball player
Justin Williams (basketball) (born 1985), American basketball player
Justin Williams (cyclist) (born 1989), American professional cyclist